Victoria Alynette Fuller (born December 11, 1970, in Santa Barbara, California, United States) is an American glamour model, artist, actress and reality TV performer.

She is Playboy magazine's Playmate of the Month for January 1996 and has appeared in numerous Playboy Special Editions.  Nine years after her Playmate appearance, she posed for Playboy again in the May 2005 issue.

Fuller appeared on the sixth season of the television show The Amazing Race with her then husband in 2004.  Since then, she appeared on Battle of the Network Reality Stars, Kill Reality and a reality-star edition of Fear Factor.

On 6 October 2006, Fuller gave birth to Trease Alynette, her only child with her husband, Jonathan. The couple divorced In 2009 after a 14-year marriage.

Fuller is a star of the  Kendra Wilkinson reality-TV show Kendra, and also pursues a professional art career, producing Pop art paintings, prints and sculptures based on the Playboy world.

The Amazing Race

The Amazing Race 6

In August 2004, Fuller competed on the sixth season of the CBS adventure reality show The Amazing Race with her husband at the time, Jonathan Baker. They were eliminated at the end of the eighth leg, finishing in sixth place.

The Amazing Race 6 finishes

 An italicized placement means it is Jonathan and Victoria's placement at the midpoint of a double leg.
A  placement with a dagger indicates that Jonathan and Victoria were eliminated. 

Roadblocks performed by Fuller are bolded 

Notes

TV guest appearances
The Amazing Race 6 playing "Herself", (2004) TV Series
Dr. Phil playing "Herself" in episode: "A Dr. Phil Primetime Special: Romance Rescue" February 15, 2005
Whose Line Is It Anyway? playing "Herself" (episode # 4.24) January 31, 2002
Howard Stern playing "Herself" March 19, 2001
David Lee Roth - No Holds Bar B Que playing "Herself" - 2001
The Man Show playing "Herself" in episode: "Playboy Mansion" (episode # 2.13) September 10, 2000
Married... with Children playing "Model #2" in episode: "Torch Song Duet" (episode # 10.26) May 19, 1996
The Girls Next Door playing "Herself" Baby Shower thrown by Hugh Hefner's main girlfriend, Holly.

References

External links

1970 births
American television actresses
American women painters
Living people
21st-century American actresses
1990s Playboy Playmates
The Amazing Race (American TV series) contestants
Actresses from Santa Barbara, California
Painters from California
Participants in American reality television series